Cornelius House is a historic home located near Mooresville, Iredell County, North Carolina.  The house was built about 1825, and is a tripartite Federal style, "T"-shaped frame dwelling with a two-story central section flanked by one-story wings.  It has a gable roof, fieldstone foundation, and a single shouldered brick end chimneys.

It was added to the National Register of Historic Places in 1980.

References

Houses on the National Register of Historic Places in North Carolina
Federal architecture in North Carolina
Houses completed in 1825
Houses in Iredell County, North Carolina
National Register of Historic Places in Iredell County, North Carolina